Rhodoneura pudicula is a species of moth of the family Thyrididae. It is found in Thailand, West Sumatra, West Malaysia, Brunei, Borneo (Sabah), Kalimantan, Java, Bali, Sulawesi, West Papua and Papua New Guinea in lowlands and lower montane forests at altitudes below 1400 m. It is the type species of the genus Rhodoneura.

External links
An Illustrated Guide to the Thyridid Moths of Borneo

References 

Moths described in 1858
Thyrididae
Moths of Borneo